John Bernard Dempsey (March 12, 1912 – August 26, 1988) was an American football tackle who played for the Pittsburgh Pirates and Philadelphia Eagles of the National Football League. He played college football at Bucknell University for the Bucknell Bison.

References

1912 births
1988 deaths
American football tackles
Bucknell Bison football players
Pittsburgh Steelers players
Philadelphia Eagles players
Players of American football from Pennsylvania
Sportspeople from Scranton, Pennsylvania